Östra Bispgården is a locality situated in Ragunda Municipality, Jämtland County, Sweden with 279 inhabitants in 2010.

References 

Populated places in Ragunda Municipality
Jämtland